Ernest Woodruff (May 23, 1863 – June 5, 1944)  was a businessman in the U.S. city of Atlanta, Georgia.

Biography
Woodruff was born in Columbus, Georgia. After relocating to Atlanta, he made his home in the Inman Park suburb, developed by his brother-in-law Joel Hurt.

Family
On April 22, 1885, Woodruff married Emily Caroline Winship, child of foundry magnate Robert Winship.

Career
With his brother-in-law Joel Hurt, Woodruff founded the Atlanta and Edgewood Street Railroad, which ran its first electric trolleys on April 22, 1889. Woodruff followed Hurt as president of the Trust Company in 1904; he held this post for 18 years before becoming chairman of the board.

Woodruff's greatest skill was in re-organizing existing companies to improve value by increased scale:

In 1903 he combined three small ice and coal companies into the Atlanta Ice and Coal Company, which went on to become Americold.

In 1910, with the help of the Trust Company, he organized ice and coal companies from Virginia and throughout the Carolinas into Atlantic Ice and Coal. With high costs of home and office deliveries, none of these companies were able to make much money on their own, but combined they made handsome returns to shareholders.

Woodruff then restructured the Atlantic Steel factory (current site of Atlantic Station) and installed Thomas Glenn to get it out of debt. The restructuring of Atlantic Steel would set the table for the biggest move of Woodruff's career: the takeover of The Coca-Cola Company in 1919, which he negotiated with Asa Griggs Candler.

Ernest Woodruff's sons, Robert W. Woodruff and George W. Woodruff, would run Coca-Cola for many years, leaving Asa Candler's son Howard Candler rather out of the picture.

References

External links
 Emily and Ernest Woodruff Foundation Records at Stuart A. Rose Manuscript, Archives, and Rare Book Library, Emory University

Coca-Cola people
History of Atlanta
Businesspeople from Atlanta
People from Columbus, Georgia
1863 births
1944 deaths